Garden path may refer to:

 Garden path, a path through a garden, see garden design
 Garden Path, a British racehorse
 Garden-path sentence, a sentence which leads the reader to an incorrect parse